Mikoš Rnjaković (born 20 April 1964) is a Serbian former cyclist. He competed in two events at the 1992 Summer Olympics as an Independent Olympic Participant. He won the Tour de Hongrie in 2001.

Major results
1985
 1st Overall Tour de Serbie
1990
 1st Overall Tour de Serbie
 1st Stage 10 Settimana Ciclistica Lombarda
1991
 1st Overall Tour de Serbie
1996
 1st Overall Tour de Serbie
1999
 5th Overall Tour de Danube
1st Prologue
2000
 1st Stage 3 Tour of Yugoslavia
 6th Overall International Tour of Rhodes
2001
 1st Overall Tour de Hongrie
 1st Stage 3 Tour d'Egypte

References

External links
 

1964 births
Living people
Serbian male cyclists
Yugoslav male cyclists
Olympic cyclists as Independent Olympic Participants
Cyclists at the 1992 Summer Olympics
People from Požega, Serbia